The Iona Gaels Men's Ice Hockey was an NCAA Division I ice hockey team that played in the MAAC for five seasons.

History
Prior to the founding of the MAAC hockey conference the Gales had been a Division III ice hockey program and were a part of the ECAC 3 conference from 1977 thru 1998. When the MAAC formed their hockey conference as per NCAA regulations, the three full member schools in the conference were forced into the conference. Due to the reticence of the other MAAC schools to start hockey programs, Iona, Canisius and Fairfield were joined by five associate members for the first season in 1998–99. In the five-year existence of the MAAC hockey conference Iona was a middle of the pack team, finishing between third and eighth place and playing in every postseason tournament. Iona's best finish came in the 2000 season when they defeated the top-seeded Quinnipiac Braves en route to a second-place finish in the tournament. Despite showing some promise in their program, Iona's board of trustees voted to eliminate the men's ice hockey program at the end of the 2002-03 season.

Iona's ice hockey program began in 1967 under Harry Nixon. As a Division III independent, the Gaels went undefeated in their inaugural year with a 16-0 record. Though Nixon stepped down after only one year, Bill Edwards was able to shepherd Iona to eight winning seasons over the next decade, finishing 1976-77 with a 26-5-1 mark. After eleven years as an independent, Iona joined the ECAC 3. Edwards coached the first two seasons of the Gaels as a conference member before being succeeded by Frank Effinger in 11 season as coach, Iona experienced an unprecedented level of success, never finishing below a .600 record. Bill Conforte took over after the 1989-90 season and though the Gaels ended with a 16-6-1 record his first year, that would be the end of their success for the near future. Iona has a steady decline in the 1990s, routinely finishing with losing records and eventually the firing of Conforte after a 2-20-3 season in 1996-97. Frank Bretti was hired for the 1997-98 season and after a 4-20-1 finish, Iona was set to join the Division I ranks.

Season-by-season records

All-time coaching records

Division I

Division III

References